Dichomeris argentenigera is a moth in the family Gelechiidae. It was described by Hou-Hun Li, Hui Zhen and Roger C. Kendrick in 2010. It is found in China (Hong Kong, Hubei).

The wingspan is 17–19 mm. The forewings are greyish brown with a silvery reflection and with the costal margin and dorsum dark brown. There are dark brown spots at three-fifths and at the end of the cell and there is a faint dark brown spot at two-thirds at the fold, as well as dark brown fascia extending from near the apex to the tornus. The hindwings are grey.

Etymology
The species name refers to the colour of the forewings and is derived from the Latin prefix argente- (meaning silvery) and the word niger (meaning black).

References

Moths described in 2010
argentenigera